Liu Yijun is the name of::

 Liu Yijun (guitarist) (born 1962), Chinese heavy metal guitarist and former member of the band Tang Dynasty
 Liu Yijun (actor) (born 1970), Chinese actor